Evil in Amsterdam is the 17th book in the Nancy Drew and Hardy Boys Supermystery series by Carolyn Keene and was published by Archway Books in November 1993.

Plot summary

Merissa Lang, a journalist talented in investigation, is marrying to Prince Andrei, an heir to the throne in the Netherlands, and Nancy and George have come to witness the real-life fairy tale wedding. But the bride is nowhere in sight, and Nancy declares it a mystery. Meanwhile, the Hardys track a load of stolen, gold bullion once in the hands of Nazis, which is worth millions, and encounter a murderer in their path at Amsterdam. Now facing a respected man with dark secrets, a man framed for murder, and a victim killed in cold blood, they soon try to join with Nancy, and investigate all possibilities.

Background and writing history

The novel was published by Pocket Books under the Archway imprint in November 1993. It was co-authored by Ellen Steiber, edited by Anne Greenberg and produced by Mega-Books with cover art by Alfons Kiefer. This book follows the formula set up in the series with the main characters and their friends involved in separate mysteries that end up being connected. The sleuths join forces to solve the overall mystery. This series is based in the Nancy Drew Files and Hardy Boys Casefiles continuity, so murder, romance and flirtation between the series regulars are common.

References

External links
Evil in Amsterdam at Fantastic Fiction
Supermystery series books

Supermystery
1993 American novels
1993 children's books
Novels set in Amsterdam